Ngadjuri is an extinct Australian Aboriginal language formerly spoken by the Ngadjuri people of South Australia, whose traditional lands covered roughly , embracing Angaston and Freeling in the south and running northwards to Clare, Crystal Brook, Gladstone up to Carrieton and Orroroo  in the Flinders Ranges.

Notes

Thura-Yura languages